Neftqaz Bakı FK was an Azerbaijani football club from Baku founded in the 1990s as Dalgix Baku.

They participated in the Azerbaijan Top Division during the 1998–99 season as Neftqaz Baku before being relegated at the end of the season after finishing 13th.

League and domestic cup history

References 

Neftqaz Baki
Defunct football clubs in Azerbaijan